The Nurses, Midwives and Health Visitors Act 1979 was an Act of Parliament of the United Kingdom. It received Royal Assent in April 1979.

It led to the establishment of the United Kingdom Central Council for Nursing, Midwifery and Health Visiting (UKCC) and national boards for each country of the UK, to be responsible for education, training, regulation and disciplinary action of nurses, midwives and health visitors.

The Act was developed by a committee established to implement the recommendations of the Briggs Report of 1972. It was finally implemented in July 1983.

The 1979 Act superseded the Midwives Act 1902 and led to the replacement of the Central Midwives Board. Midwives such as Brenda Mee fought to ensure that midwives would be the majority on each midwifery committee, and that their views would be represented when proposals were put forward concerning midwifery.

There were subsequent Acts in 1992 and 1997. The Nurses, Midwives and Health Visitors Act 1992 established that investigation of misconduct was the responsibility of the UKCC and not the national boards. The Nurses, Midwives and Health Visitors Act 1997 made adjustments to the structure and composition of the UKCC.

See also 

 Nurses Registration Act 1919

References 

Nursing in the United Kingdom
United Kingdom Acts of Parliament 1979